was the 70th emperor of Japan, according to the traditional order of succession.

Go-Reizei's reign spanned the years 1045–1068.

This 11th century sovereign was named after the 10th century Emperor Reizei and go- (後), translates literally as "later;" and thus, he is sometimes called the "Later Emperor Reizei". The Japanese word "go" has also been translated to mean the "second one;" and in some older sources, this emperor may be identified as "Reizei, the second," or as "Reizei II."

Biography
Before his ascension to the Chrysanthemum Throne, his personal name (imina) was Chikahito-shinnō (親仁親王). He was the eldest son of Emperor Go-Suzaku.  His mother was Fujiwara no Kishi (藤原嬉子), formerly Naishi-no kami, daughter of Fujiwara no Michinaga. Go-Reizei had three Empresses and no Imperial sons or daughters.

Events of Go-Reizei's life

When Emperor Go-Suzaku abdicated on February 5, 1045, his eldest son received the succession (‘‘senso’’) on the same day. Emperor Go-Reizei formally acceded to the throne (‘‘sokui’’) shortly after, and the era name was changed the following year to mark the beginning of his reign. His father Go-Suzaku died at the age of 37 on February 7, 1045 of unknown causes The one major event in Go-Reizei's life occurred in the year 1051, when Abe no Sadatō and Munetō instigated a rebellion that became known as the Zenkunen War (1051–1062). In response, Minamoto no Yoriyoshi is appointed governor of Mutsu and he is named chinjufu shōgun. He is given these titles and powers so that he will be able to restore peace in the north. Yoriyoshi would have been the first to receive this specific shogunal title, although his grandfather (Minamoto no Tsunemoto) had been seitō fuku-shōgun (assistant commander for pacification of the east). Go-Reizei later died on May 22, 1068 at the age of 44 leaving no direct heirs to the throne. He was succeeded by his father's second son Takahito-shinnō aka Emperor Go-Sanjō.

The actual site of Go-Reizei's grave is known.  This emperor is traditionally venerated at a memorial Shinto shrine (misasagi) though at Kyoto. The Imperial Household Agency designates this location as Go-Reizei's mausoleum.  It is formally named Enkyo-ji no misasagi. Go-Reizei is buried amongst the "Seven Imperial Tombs" at Ryōan-ji Temple in Kyoto. The mound which commemorates the Hosokawa Emperor Go-Reizei is today named Shu-zan.  The emperor's burial place would have been quite humble in the period after Go-Reizei died. These tombs reached their present state as a result of the 19th century restoration of imperial sepulchers (misasagi) which were ordered by Emperor Meiji.

Kugyō
 is a collective term for the very few most powerful men attached to the court of the Emperor of Japan in pre-Meiji eras. Even during those years in which the court's actual influence outside the palace walls was minimal, the hierarchic organization persisted.

In general, this elite group included only three to four men at a time.  These were hereditary courtiers whose experience and background would have brought them to the pinnacle of a life's career.  During Go-Reizei's reign, this apex of the Daijō-kan included:
 Kampaku, Fujiwara Yorimichi, 992–1074.
 Kampaku, Fujiwara Norimichi, 997–1075.
 Daijō-daijin, Fujiwara Yorimichi.
 Sadaijin, Fujiwara Norimichi.
 Sadaijin
 Udaijin, Fujiwara Sanesuke, 957–1046.
 Udaijin, Fujiwara  Yorimune, 993–1065.
 Udaijin, Fujiwara Morozane, 1042–1101.
 Nadaijin, Minamoto Morofusa, 1009–1077.
 Dainagon

Eras of Go-Reizei's reign 
The years of Go-Reizei's reign are more specifically identified by more than one era name or nengō.
 Kantoku      (1044–1046)
 Eishō    (1046–1053)
 Tengi        (1053–1058)
 Kōhei  (1058–1065)
 Jiryaku      (1065–1069)

Empresses and consorts
Empress (chūgū): Imperial Princess Shōshi (章子内親王, 1027–1105) later Nijō-in (二条院), Emperor Go-Ichijo’s daughter.

Empress (kōgō): Fujiwara no Hiroko (藤原寛子; 1036–1127) later Shijō no Miya (四条宮), Fujiwara no Yorimichi‘s daughter

Empress (kōgō): Fujiwara no Kanshi (藤原歓子; 1021–1102) later Ono-no-Kōtaigō (小野皇太后), Fujiwara no Norimichi‘s daughter
 Son (1049)

Consort: Sugawara family's daughter
 son: Takashina Tameyuki (高階為行; 1059-1107）

Ancestry

Notes

References
 Brown, Delmer M. and Ichirō Ishida, eds. (1979).  Gukanshō: The Future and the Past. Berkeley: University of California Press. ;  OCLC 251325323
 Moscher, Gouverneur. (1978). Kyoto: A Contemplative Guide. ;  OCLC 4589403
 Ponsonby-Fane, Richard Arthur Brabazon. (1959).  The Imperial House of Japan. Kyoto: Ponsonby Memorial Society. OCLC 194887
 Titsingh, Isaac. (1834). Nihon Odai Ichiran; ou,  Annales des empereurs du Japon.  Paris: Royal Asiatic Society, Oriental Translation Fund of Great Britain and Ireland.  OCLC 5850691
 Varley, H. Paul. (1980). Jinnō Shōtōki: A Chronicle of Gods and Sovereigns. New York: Columbia University Press. ;  OCLC 59145842

See also
 Emperor of Japan
 List of Emperors of Japan
 Imperial cult

 
 

Japanese emperors
1025 births
1068 deaths
11th-century Japanese monarchs
People of Heian-period Japan
People from Kyoto